This is a list of singles that have peaked in the Top 10 of the Billboard Hot 100 during 2005.

50 Cent scored six top ten hits during the year with "Disco Inferno", "How We Do", "Candy Shop", "Hate It or Love It", "Just a Lil Bit", and "Outta Control (remix)", the most among all other artists.

Top-ten singles
Key
 – indicates single's top 10 entry was also its Hot 100 debut
 – indicates Best performing song of the year
(#) – 2005 year-end top 10 single position and rank

2004 peaks

2006 peaks

See also
 2005 in music
 List of Hot 100 number-one singles of 2005 (U.S.)
 Billboard Year-End Hot 100 singles of 2005

References

General sources

Joel Whitburn Presents the Billboard Hot 100 Charts: The 2000s
Additional information obtained can be verified within Billboard's online archive services and print editions of the magazine.

2005
United States Hot 100 Top 10